Thomas Stefan Persson (born 15 May 1985) is a Swedish billionaire businessman, who works in the film industry. He is an heir of the fashion company Hennes & Mauritz (H&M), which was founded by his grandfather Erling Persson in 1947. On the Forbes 2019 list of the world's billionaires, he was ranked #1300 with a net worth of US$1.9 billion.

Early life
The son and youngest child of Stefan Persson and his first wife Pamela Collett, Thomas Persson attended and graduated from the Met Film School in London.

Career
He works in the film industry as a producer, producing two films in 2017.

Personal life
In May 2016, he married his long-term girlfriend, Swedish-born Sofia Strandman, at the family estate in Ramsbury, England.

References

1985 births
Living people
Swedish billionaires
Tom